Air Mail is a digital weekly newsletter launched in July 2019 by former Vanity Fair editor-in-chief Graydon Carter and former New York Times reporter Alessandra Stanley. Private equity firm TPG Capital served as Air Mail's majority investor.

The New York Times announced the launch of Air Mail, calling it a weekly newsletter for "worldly cosmopolitans." The weekly's writers include
Alessandra Stanley, Michael Lewis, William D. Cohan, and others.

References

External links 
 

Newsletters
Digital media
Lifestyle magazines published in the United States
Magazines established in 2019
2019 establishments in New York City